BC Parma, also known as Parma Basket, is a professional basketball team that is based in Perm, Russia. It plays in the VTB United League, the highest level of basketball in Russia. The club's full name is Parma Basket Perm. The name is unrelated with the Italian city of Parma.

History
BC Parma was established in 2012. In 2016, Parma Basket won the Russian Cup title, by beating Zenit Saint Petersburg in the Russian Cup Final.
In the 2016–17 season, Parma joined the VTB United League, the country's first tier league. To meet the arena requirements of the league, Parma moved to the Universal Sports Palace Molot. In its first United League season the club finished last in the regular season with just one win.

In 2020, Parma made its debut in the main stage of a European competition as the team played in the 2020–21 FIBA Europe Cup. After surviving the group stage, the team beat Rilski Sportist and Balkan Botevgrad in the eight- and quarterfinals. It qualified for the Final Four that is to be played in Tel Aviv.

Players

Current roster

Notable players

  Tony Carr

Individual awards
United League Young Player of the Year
Ivan Ukhov – 2017

Season by season

European record

Arenas

During its existence, Parma Basket has played in the following arenas:
 Sportcomplex Sukhanov (2012–2016)
 Universal Sports Palace Molot (2016–present)

Honours
Russian Cup
Winners (2): 2015–16, 2018–19
FIBA Europe Cup
Fourth place (1): 2020–21
Gomelsky Cup
Runners-up (1): 2020

Head coaches

See also
Ural Great

References

External links
Official website 

Basketball teams in Russia
Sport in Perm, Russia
Basketball teams established in 2012